The 1960 ABC Championship was the first edition of the ABC Championship, a tournament which was held by FIBA Asia. The tournament which was held in Manila, Philippines saw seven teams compete in a round-robin tournament with the top four teams qualifying through to the final round where they played each other again one more time.

In the final round, the Philippines took out the title as they won all nine of their games to come out the winners. Taiwan finished as the runner-up with the only two losses being against the champions. Japan rounded out the podium in third.

Preliminary round

Final round
 The results and the points of the preliminary round shall be taken into account for the final round.

Final standing

Awards

References
 Results
 archive.fiba.com

1960 in Asian basketball
1960
International basketball competitions hosted by the Philippines
1960 in Philippine basketball
January 1960 sports events in Asia